Ashwath may refer to any of the following:

 K. S. Ashwath, an Indian Actor.
 C. Aswath, an Indian Playback Singer.
 Aswath Damodaran